Bala Kahriz (also Romanized as Bālā Kahrīz) is a village in Churs Rural District, in the Central District of Chaypareh County, West Azerbaijan Province, Iran. At the 2006 census, its population was 90, in 22 families.

References 

Populated places in Chaypareh County